Charles Harpur (23 January 1813 – 10 June 1868) was an Australian poet and playwright. He is regarded as "Australia's most important nineteenth-century poet."

Life

Early life on the Hawkesbury 
Harpur was born on 23 January 1813 at Windsor, New South Wales. His parents were convicts. His father, Joseph Harpur, was originally from Kinsale, County Cork, Ireland. He had been sentenced to transportation for highway robbery in March 1800; at the time of Harpur's birth, he was parish clerk and master of the Windsor district school. His mother, Sarah Chidley, was originally from Somerset, and had been sentenced to transportation in 1805. Harpur presumably went to school in Windsor, but little information about his education is available. Later in life, he claimed that he taught himself the principles of English verse by obsessively reading William Shakespeare.

Sydney and first publications 
In the early 1830s, Harpur seems to have moved between Sydney and the Hunter Valley, but by 1833 he had settled with his parents in Sydney. At this time he began to publish his writings in newspapers. His earliest known publications were the poems 'An Australian Song' and 'At the Grave of Clements', which appeared in The Currency Lad on the 4th and 11 May 1833. In February 1835 he published parts of his first play, The Tragedy of Donohoe, in The Sydney Monitor, a radical newspaper edited by Edward Smith Hall. Harpur would continue to publish in newspapers throughout his life, eventually publishing hundreds of works in this manner.

In Sydney, Harpur worked as a clerk and letter-sorter in the Post Office, while pursuing a career in the theatre. He acted in three plays at the Theatre Royal in October 1833: The Mutiny at the Nore by Douglas Jerrold, The Miller and His Men by Isaac Pocock, and The Tragedy of Chrononhotonthologos, a farce. His acting career ended ignominiously, when he unsuccessfully sued Barnett Levey, the proprietor of the Theatre Royal, for unpaid wages. His career at the Post Office ended equally poorly, after he quarrelled with the Postmaster-General.

During these years, Harpur befriended many of Sydney's prominent literary and political figures, including Henry Parkes, Daniel Deniehy, and W. A. Duncan. Looking back at the end of his life, Parkes traced the development of his radical politics back to this circle of friends:I had now formed the acquaintance of two men of more than ordinary character and ability, Mr. Charles Harpur, one of the most genuine of Australian poets, and Mr. William Augustine Duncan, then proprietor and editor of the 'Weekly Register.' They were my chief advisers in matters of intellectual resource and enquiry, when the prospect before me was opening and widening, often with many cross lights and drifting clouds, but ever with deepening radiance.

Farming in the Hunter Valley 
Harpur had left Sydney two years before and was farming with a brother on the Hunter River. In 1850, he married Mary Doyle and engaged in sheep farming for some years with varying success.

Move to Eurobodalla and death 
In 1858, he was appointed gold commissioner at Araluen with a good salary. He held the position for eight years and also had a farm at Eurobodalla. Harpur found, however, that his duties prevented him from supervising the work on the farm and it became a bad investment.

Two verse pamphlets, A Poet's Home and The Tower of a Dream, appeared in 1862 and 1865 respectively.

In 1866, Harpur's position was abolished at a time of retrenchment, and in March 1867 he had a great sorrow when his second son was killed by the accidental discharge of his own gun. Harpur never recovered from the blow. He contracted tuberculosis in the hard winter of 1867, and died on 10 June 1868. He was buried on his property, "Euroma", beside the grave of his son. He was survived by his wife, two sons and two daughters. One of his daughters, writing many years later, mentioned that he had left his family an unencumbered farm and a well-furnished comfortable home.

In 1988, as part of Australia's bicentennial celebrations, a plaque was laid at the site of Harpur's grave, describing him as "Australia’s first native born poet".

Work

Textual history 
Harpur continually revised, redrafted and republished his works throughout his life, creating an "editorial nightmare". In all he is credited with over 700 poems, which exist in some 2,700 distinct versions. His major play, The Tragedy of Donohoe, exists in four distinct versions, with different titles, plots and names for the characters. Many of his works exist only in manuscript, or lie scattered among dozens of newspapers and journals. In the past, this hindered research into Harpur's work, because only a small portion was available in reliable and accessible texts. In the twentieth century, however, editors such as Charles Salier, Elizabeth Perkins and Michael Ackland greatly improved the situation, by publishing wide selections of Harpur's poetry in book form. In the twenty-first century, Paul Eggert embarked on an ambitious project to make every version of every Harpur poem available online, along with tools to examine Harpur's complex process of rewriting. The fruit of this project was the Charles Harpur Critical Archive, the first variorum edition of Harpur's poetry.

Description of the bush 

Many of Harpur's poems describe the Australian bush. Scholars have praised the accuracy and variety of his natural descriptions, while also critiquing his tendency to 'gothicise' the Australian landscape. In 'gothicising' poems such as "The Creek of the Four Graves", Harpur depicts the Australian landscape as dark, strange, wild and exotic. Some scholars argue that this gothic depiction of the Australian landscape implies that Australia was a terra nullius, and that Harpur's poetry therefore supports the expropriation of Aboriginal lands. In other poems, however, Harpur presents a more positive view of the Australian bush. In "The Kangaroo Hunt," Harpur invokes an Aboriginal deity as his Muse, while in "Aboriginal Death Song", he makes explicit reference to Aboriginal sovereignty over land within their "borders". Observing these different strains in his poetry, some scholars argue that Harpur's nature poetry is ironic; rather than describing nature from his own perspective, Harpur's poetry describes how nature appears from the point of view of different characters.

Harpur underpinned his nature poetry with a sophisticated theory of natural description. This theory relied on two central principles. The first principle was personal experience: in his poetry, Harpur describes the Australian bush based on his own observations and interactions with Aboriginal people. He accurately describes the appearance and behaviour of many bird species in his poetry, for example, and refers to animals by their Indigenous names. The second principle was "sublimation" or "compression": rather than describing a particular scene, the poet should combine many observations together to give a complete picture of nature at different times. Through such "sublimation" or "compression", the poet could reveal the workings of the human mind, and expose the spirital or divine aspect of the natural world.

Bibliography

Books 
 Thoughts: A Series of Sonnets (1845)
 The Bushrangers, a Play in Five Acts, and Other Poems (1853)

Pamphlets 
 Songs of Australia (1850)
 A Poet's Home (1862)

Posthumous Editions 
 Poems (1883)
 Selected Poems of Charles Harpur (1944)
 Rosa: Love Sonnets to Mary Doyle (1948)
 Charles Harpur edited by Donovan Clarke (1963)
 Charles Harpur edited by Adrian Mitchell (1973)
 Early Love Poems (1979)
 The Poetical Works of Charles Harpur edited by Elizabeth Perkins (1984) 
 Charles Harpur, Selected Poetry and Prose edited by Michael Ackland (1986) 
 Stalwart the Bushranger, with, The Tragedy of Donohoe edited by Elizabeth Perkins (1987) 
 A Storm in the Mountains and Lost in the Bush (2006) 
 Charles Harpur Critical Archive edited by Paul Eggert (2019)

Major works
 "The Creek of the Four Graves" (1845)
 "A Mid-Summer Noon in the Australian Forest" (1851)

Select individual poems
Nature
 "A Storm in the Mountains" (1856)
 The Cloud (1857)
 To an Echo on the Banks of the Hunter (1846)
 On Leaving x x x, after a residence there of several Months.
 The Bush Fire
 The Scenic Part of Poetry

Indigenous Australians
 A Wail from the Bush (1845)

Poetic craft
 The Nevers of Poesy (1857)
 The Poverty of Greatness (1845)
 On Completing a Book (1851)

Politics
 The Great Change (1850)
 The Tree of Liberty (1846)
 Australia, Huzza! (1833)
 A War-Song for the Nineteenth Century (1843)
 This Southern Land of Ours (1855)
 Is Wentworth a Patriot? (1845)

Love
 The Lass of Eulengo
 Love is simple
 The Tortures of Love (1844)
 To Ellen (1856)

Religion
 Trust in God (1853)

Teetotalism
 The Spirit of the Bowl (1854)
 The Merit of Sobriety (1857)

Ballads
 Alan of the Mill

Epigrams
 To a Girl Who Stole an Apple Tree
 Whatever is, is Right(?)
 The World's Way
 Neither will do
 Finish of Style
 Evasion
 Shortness of Life (1856)

Unusual subjects
 The Anchor (1855)
 The Beautiful (1857)
 Farewel (1846)
 The Infinite in Space (1866)

References

External links

 The Charles Harpur Critical Archive
 
 
 The Bushrangers: A play in five acts at Sydney University
 Poems at Sydney University

1813 births
1868 deaths
Australian people of English descent
19th-century poets
19th-century Australian poets